Odense Håndbold (in its first season: Odense GOG and after that Handball Club Odense) is a Danish women's handball team, that plays in Damehåndboldligaen, Denmark's premier women's handball league. It was created in August 2009 and took over GOG Svendborg TGI's license for the league, which was published in a press meeting August 27, 2009 in Odense Idrætshal. They changed their name to Odense Håndbold (Odense Handball) before the beginning of the 2016/2017 season.

The team's home court is Sydbank Arena in the city of Odense and they play in orange shirts and black shorts.

They are currently competing in the 2022–23 Women's EHF Champions League.

Kits

Achievements
Danish League: 
Winner: 2021, 2022
Runners-up: 2018, 2020
Third place: 2019

Danish Cup
Winner: 2020
Runners-up: 2018, 2019, 2022

Stadium 
Name: Sydbank Arena
City: Odense
Capacity: 2,300 seats
Address:  Odense Idrætshal, Israels Plads 3, 5200 Odense

Team

Current squad

Squad for the 2022–23 season
 

Goalkeepers
 1  Martina Thörn   
 16  Althea Reinhardt
 17  Freja Fagerberg
Wingers
LW
 6  Freja Cohrt
 7  Bo van Wetering
RW
 21  Ayaka Ikehara
 31  Kelly Vollebregt
Line players
 3  Maren Nyland Aardahl
 11  Rikke Iversen
 64  Sidsel Mejlvang

Back players
LB
 8  Lois Abbingh
 25  Tonje Løseth
 32  Mie Højlund
CB
 5  Trine Pedersen 
 9  Larissa Nusser 
 68  Helena Elver
 90  Mia Rej 
RB
 48  Dione Housheer

Transfers
Transfers for the 2023–24 season

 Joining
  Ole Gustav Gjekstad (Head coach) (from  Vipers Kristiansand)
  Yara ten Holte (GK) (from  Borussia Dortmund Handball)
  Elma Halilcevic (LW) (from  Nykøbing Falster Håndboldklub)
  Ragnhild Valle Dahl (LB) (from  Vipers Kristiansand)
  Nina Dano (RB) (from  HH Elite)
  Malin Aune (RW) (from  CSM București)
  Andrea Hansen (RW) (from  København Håndbold)
  Nikita van der Vliet (P) (from  Nykøbing Falster Håndboldklub) 

 Leaving
  Ulrik Kirkely (Head coach) (to  Győri Audi ETO KC)
  Martina Thörn (GK)
  Freja Cohrt (LW)
  Lois Abbingh (LB) (to  Vipers Kristiansand)
  Trine Pedersen (CB) (retires)
  Ayaka Ikehara (RW)
  Kelly Vollebregt (RW) (to  Neptunes de Nantes)
  Rikke Iversen (P) (to  Team Esbjerg)

Technical staff
  Head coach: Ulrik Kirkely
  Assistant coach: Kristian Danielsen 
  Goalkeeping coach: Frederik Skou Hansen
  Goalkeeping coach: Gitte Sunesen
  Team Leader: Trine Trampedach
  Team Leader: Lilian Maag
  Physiotherapist: Anja David Greve
  Physiotherapist: Berit Duus
  Physiotherapist: Maj Tornøe Johansen
  Sports Director: Trine Nielsen

Previous squads

Notable former players

  Kamilla Larsen (2009–2022)
  Freja Cohrt (2017–2023)
  Stine Jørgensen (2017–2020)
  Line Jørgensen (2009–2010)
  Nadia Offendal (2013–2020)
  Trine Østergaard (2017–2020)
  Kathrine Heindahl (2017–2020)
  Rikke Iversen (2020–2023)
  Pernille Holmsgaard (2009–2011)
  Cecilie Greve (2010–2015)
  Trine Jensen (2011–2013)
  Mette Tranborg (2017–2020)
  Anne Mette Pedersen (2019–2020)
  Sarah Iversen (2012–2016)
  Ditte Vind (2013–2016)
  Line Haugsted (2015–2016)
  Susan Thorsgaard (2016–2019)
  Susanne Madsen (2011–2013) (2016–2020)
  Sara Hald (2018–2021)
  Trine Pedersen (2021–2023)
  Anne Cecilie de la Cour (2020–2021)
  Marianne Bonde (2017)
  Jessica Helleberg (2013–2015)
  Maria Adler (2013–2017)
  Tina Flognman (2009–2010)
  Gabriella Kain (2008–2010)
  Nathalie Hagman (2019–2020)
  Angelica Wallén (2020–2021)
  Martina Thörn (2021–2023)
  Ingrid Ødegård (2012–2013)
  Siri Seglem (2013–2015)
  Maja Jakobsen (2015–2019)
  Emily Stang Sando (2017–2018)
  Ingvild Bakkerud (2018–2020)
  Malene Aambakk (2020–2022)
  Nycke Groot (2019–2021, 2022)
  Tess Wester (2018–2021)
  Lois Abbingh (2020–2023)
  Jasmina Janković (2008–2009)
  Pearl van der Wissel (2012–2018)
  Kelly Vollebregt (2021–2023)
  Jéssica Quintino (2016–2021)
  Chana Masson (2015–2017)
  Deonise Fachinello (2016–2017)
  Ayaka Ikehara (2020–2023)
  Oksana Kiseleva (2016–2017)
  Elisabeth Pinedo (2010–2011)

Statistics

Top scorers in the EHF Champions League 
Last updated on 19 March 2023

European record

Champions League

EHF Cup

Cup Winners' Cup

Kit manufacturers
 Puma (−2017)
 Adidas (2017–2019)
 Craft Sportswear (2019–)

References

External links 
 GOG får ønsket dispensation (Dansk Håndboldforbund) 
 ODENSE GOG en realitet (gog.dk) 
 Grønt lys til Odense GOG (dr.dk) 
 Officielt: Odense GOG er skabt (TV2) 

Danish handball clubs